Franco Luis Torgnascioli Lagreca (born 24 August 1990) is an Uruguayan professional footballer who plays as a goalkeeper for Primera B de Chile club San Luis on loan from Everton.

Career
In July 2017, he was loaned to Spanish side Lorca FC from Pachuca.

In July 2022, he was loaned to San Luis de Quillota in the Primera B de Chile from Everton de Viña del Mar until the end of the season.

References

External links
 Franco Torgnascioli profile at Ascenso MX 
 
 

1990 births
Living people
Footballers from Salto, Uruguay
Uruguayan footballers
Association football goalkeepers
Danubio F.C. players
Boston River players
C.F. Pachuca players
Mineros de Zacatecas players
Lorca FC players
Everton de Viña del Mar footballers
San Luis de Quillota footballers
Uruguayan Primera División players
Uruguayan Segunda División players
Ascenso MX players
Segunda División players
Liga MX players
Chilean Primera División players
Primera B de Chile players
Uruguayan expatriate footballers
Expatriate footballers in Mexico
Expatriate footballers in Spain
Expatriate footballers in Chile
Uruguayan expatriate sportspeople in Mexico
Uruguayan expatriate sportspeople in Spain
Uruguayan expatriate sportspeople in Chile